The 1982 Omloop Het Volk was the 37th edition of the Omloop Het Volk cycle race and was held on 6 March 1982. The race started in Ghent and finished in Lokeren. The race was won by Alfons De Wolf.

General classification

References

1982
Omloop Het Nieuwsblad
Omloop Het Nieuwsblad
March 1982 sports events in Europe